is a word used in names of some post-secondary educational institutions in Japan.  The National Defense Academy of Japan (Bōei Daigakkō) was established with École Polytechnique as its model. Most institutions in Japan that use "daigakkō" as part of their name are not certified as degree-issuing secondary schools by the Japanese Ministry of Education, Culture, Sports, Science and Technology or National Institution for Academic Degrees and University Evaluation (NIAD-UE), an independent organization.

Etymology
Daigakkō has a literal meaning of "grand school" or "great school". It comes from a literal translation of the French "grandes écoles". Common English translations include "academy", "college", or "university".

Usage

Japan
In Japan, use of the word "daigakkō"(大学校) is not regulated by laws or ordinances, so many educational or training facilities are named as "daigakko". Those are categorized as follows:

The training facilities operated by the governmental offices such as ministries and agencies.
The lectures as lifelong learning for the citizens provided by local governments.
The educational facilities which are certified as they can provide education as same as Universities and Graduate schools, and which can provide academic degrees.
The educational facilities which provide higher education, but can't provide academic degrees.
The special schools named "daigakkō" before School Education Act in enforce in 1947.

Korea
In Korea, four-year universities and colleges are referred to as "大學校" (pronounced as "Taehakkyo" in Korean). Korea University ("朝鮮大學校", pronounced Chosŏn Taehakkyo in Korean) in Japan, which has a relationship with the North Korean government, but it can not provide any academic degrees recognized in Japan because it is not certified  by the Japanese Ministry of Education.

Daigakkō and other post-secondary institutions
Because usage of "daigakkō" in the title of an institution is not regulated by laws or ordinances, they offer a wide range of courses and degrees. These can include accredited, full-time, six-year courses, or single-day training courses. The institutions can be established by national or local governments, or by private organizations.
 by the local boards of education or the governors of the prefectures.

Current institutions certified by MEXT are either "daigaku" (大学) or "tanki daigaku" (短期大学, meaning "junior college").

NIAD-QE accredited
Some daigakkō's mainstream courses are accredited by the National Institution for Academic Degrees and University Evaluation (NIAD-UE), an independent administrative institution (IAI) affiliated with MEXT. The graduates can obtain academic degrees awarded by the NIAD-UE by application.

National institutions
The following daigakkō are administered by the national government, and the tuition-fee is for free and the students are paid salary. In addition, these daigakkō are specially called "Shō-Chō-Daigakkō"(Ministry-Agency-Daigakkō, 省庁大学校) which are regulated to be founded by laws. The students in the following schools are appointed as government officials automatically when they entered, and they are paid salary every month, and they are exempted from paying tuition-fee. National Defense Medical College graduates who retire before serving nine years for the Japan Self-Defense Forces must repay their training costs. The following schools are the only daigakkō which are certified by NIAD-UE.

Independent institutions
The mainstream students of these institutions must pay tuition fees similar to those at Japanese national universities.
  (NFU ): an IAI affiliated with the Ministry of Agriculture, Forestry and Fisheries. Offers: B,M.
  (PU ): an IAI affiliated with the MHLW. Offers: B,M.

NIAD-UE unaccredited

Government administered
The government-run training courses for public servants. Note that institutions whose objectives and functions are similar but names are not daigakkō, and instead say gakkō ("school"), are not included in this list; these schools are not certified by NIAD-UE, so they cannot award academic degrees.

NGO-administered
Postal College runs training courses for the employees of Japan Post.
 : Japan Post

Independently administered
All of the providers of the following daigakkō are Independent Administrative Institutions(IAI).

Before 1947

Notes

References

Daigakkō in Japan